Family Album is a 1985 romance novel by American  Danielle Steel. It was adapted into a 1994 TV miniseries starring Jaclyn Smith. It is Steel's eighteenth novel.

Plot
Family Album tells the story of Faye Price (later Thayer), since World War II to her death in present day. It relates her professional life as an actress in Hollywood's golden era to finally becoming one of the first female directors in Hollywood. But more important to her is her family life, from her marriage, the birth of her children, separations and reconciliations with her husband, the struggles to raise her children, and the problems they go through once grown up until, in the end, they come through stronger from the ordeal.

Adaptation

Family Album was adapted by Karol Ann Hoeffner into a 1994 NBC television miniseries starring Jaclyn Smith as Faye and Michael Ontkean as Ward. Though the plot was simplified from the original novel, it retains the basic story.

External links
 

1985 American novels
Novels by Danielle Steel
American novels adapted into films
Novels about actors
American novels adapted into television shows
Novels set in California
Delacorte Press books
American romance novels